Kozhikode district has an extensive network of road, rail and air travel services.  Kozhikode city is the epicenter of the district. Vatakara and Thamarassery are other transport hubs.

Road

The city has a reasonably well-developed transport infrastructure. A large number of buses, predominantly run by individual owners, ply on the major routes within the city and to nearby locations. City buses are painted green. Kerala State Road Transport Corporation (KSRTC) runs regular services to many destinations in the state and to the neighbouring states. The city has three bus stands. All private buses to the suburban and nearby towns ply from the Palayam Bus Stand. Private buses to adjoining districts start from the Mofussil Bus Stand (one of the largest bus stand in Kerala) on Indira Gandhi Road (Mavoor Road). Buses operated by the KSRTC drive from the KSRTC bus stand on Indira Gandhi Road. KSRTC Bus Stand Kozhikode is the biggest bus stand in Kerala having a size of 36,036.47-meter square. There are also KSRTC depots in Thamarassery, Thottilpalam, Thiruvambady and Vatakara in the district.

There are two routes available to Bangalore. One is Kozhikode–Gundlupet–Mysore–Bangalore; this road is most preferred one but is very busy. Another route, less used, is Kozhikode–Gundlupet–Chamarajanagar–Kollegal–Bangalore.

Private tour operators maintain regular luxury bus services to Mumbai, Bangalore, Coimbatore, Chennai, Vellore, Ernakulam, Trivandrum, Ooty etc. and mainly operate from the Palayam area. These are usually night services.

National Highways

National Highway 66 connects Kozhikode to Mumbai via Mangalore, Udupi and Goa to the north and Kochi and Kanyakumari near Thiruvananthapuram to the south along the west coast of India. This highway connects the city with the other important towns like, Uppala, Kasaragod, Kanhangad, Payyanur, TaliparambaKannur, Thalassery, Mahe, Vadakara, Koyilandy, Vengalam,
Ramanattukara, Kottakkal, Kuttippuram, Ponnani, (Guruvayoor) Chavakkad, Kodungallur, North Paravur, Edapally and proceed to Kanyakumari.

National Highway 766 connects Kozhikode to Bangalore through Kollegal in Karnataka via Tirumakudal Narsipur, Mysore, Nanjangud, Gundlupet, Sulthan Bathery, Kalpetta and Thamarassery. This highway also connects the city with the suburbs like Malaparamba, Kunnamangalam and premier institutes like IIMK, NIT-C, IISR and CWRDM.

National Highway 966 connects Kozhikode to Palakkad via Malappuram. At Ramanattukara, a suburb of Kozhikode, it joins NH 66. It also passes through towns like Kondotty, Malappuram, Perinthalmanna, and Mannarkkad. This stretch also connects the city and Calicut International Airport.

State Highways

SH 54 is connecting city and Kalpetta. It connects SH 38, Kuttiady, Thottilpalam, Korome, Vellamunda, Tharuvana and Padinharethara.

SH 68 starts from Kappad and ends in Adivaram. The highway passes through Atholi, Nanminda, Narikkuni, Padanilam, Koduvally, Omassery & Kodanchery.

SH 34 starts from Koyilandy and ends in Edavanna. The highway passes through Ulliyeri, Balusseri, Thamarassery, Omassery, Mukkam & Areekode.

SH 38 starts from Puthiyangadi (Kozhikode) and ends in Chowa (Kannur). The highway passes through Pavangad, Kozhikode, Ulliyeri, Perambra, Kuttiady, Nadapuram, Panoor, Kuthuparamba, Peralassery, Mavilayi and Kadachira.

Rail

The history of railways in Malabar dates back to 1861 when the first tracks were laid between Tirur and Beypore. Kozhikode railway station is the only A1 railway station in Palakkad railway division and it is situated in the Shoranur-Mangalore section. Today, Kozhikode is well connected by rail to cities like Thiruvananthapuram, Kochi, Kollam, Palakkad, Coimbatore, Katpadi, Vellore, Chennai, Bangalore, Kannur, Mangalore, Mumbai, New Delhi,
Vijayawada, Visakhapatnam, and Hyderabad.

Public transport

The city buses of Kozhikode are green coloured and they are very cheap and punctual.  All the city buses start and end at the Mananchira Pond area.  Buses going to the northern side originate from the Post Office side of the pond.  Buses gong southwards originate from the Girls school side. Buses going to the eastern side originate from the Income Tax office area. The new government bus station on the Mavoor Road is the boarding point for long distance buses.  This modern bus station has 350,000 sq.ft.space shops and parking facilities.

Kozhikode is one of the cities to be granted the new generation air-conditioned low floor and non-air-conditioned semi low-floor buses under the JNNURM city transport development project. KURTC and private buses operate frequent schedules to neighbouring areas including NIT Calicut, IIMK etc.  Call taxis and auto rickshaws (called autos) are available for hire.

Bus stand in kozhikode city 
 Moffusil bus stand(new busstand
 Palayam bus stand
 K.S.R.T.C bus stand
 City bus stand manachira

Air

Regular domestic services are operated to major Indian cities. There are frequent international flights to the Middle eastern air hubs like Dubai, Abu Dhabi, Salalah, Muscat, Dammam, Riyadh, Jeddah, Sharjah, Bahrain, Doha and to domestic hubs Chennai, Bangalore, Mumbai and New Delhi.

Light Metro Rail
Kozhikode LightMetro is a proposed mass rapid transport system (MRTS) for the city of Kozhikode (Calicut), in India. In 2010, the State government explored the possibility of implementing a metro rail project for Kozhikode city and its suburbs. The proposal was to have a corridor connecting the Karipur Airport to the Kozhikode Medical College Hospital through the heart of the city. An inception report was submitted by a Bangalore-based consultant, Wilber Smith, on the detailed feasibility study on the prospect of implementing the Mass Rapid Transport System (MRTS) and Light Rail Transit System (LRTS) in the city.  However, the project has been scrapped to be replaced by Kozhikode Monorail project. The State Cabinet then decided to form a special purpose vehicle (SPV) to implement monorail projects in Kozhikode and Thiruvananthapuram, and administrative sanction was given in October 2012, Finally, in the aspect led by the High Council met 18 May 2015 and decided to light metro.

References

Transport in Kozhikode district